El Limón, Spanish for "the lemon", may refer to:

Places

Dominican Republic
 El Limón, Independencia, a municipality in the province of Independencia
 El Limón, Samaná, a municipality in the province of Samaná
 El Limón, Santiago, a municipality in the province of Santiago

Mexico
 El Limón, Jalisco, a municipality in state of Jalisco
 El Limón, Tamaulipas, a municipality in state of Tamaulipas

Panama
 El Limón, Herrera

Venezuela
 El Limón, Venezuela, a city in the state of Aragua
 El Limón River

People
 Alvaro de Jesús Agudelo, Pablo Escobar's driver, who was killed with Escobar 
 Rafael Herbert Reyes, Dominican born professional wrestler

See also
 Limón (disambiguation)